The Embassy of Tunisia at 29 Princes's Gate in the South Kensington district of London is the diplomatic mission of Tunisia in the United Kingdom.

The embassy is situated in a mid 19th-century stucco terraced house overlooking Hyde Park in Kensington Road, Westminster, London, next door to the Embassy of the United Arab Emirates and the Embassy of Afghanistan. The three embassies are part of a single group of Grade II listed buildings at 26—31 Prince's Gate.

Gallery

References

External list

Tunisia
Diplomatic missions of Tunisia
Tunisia–United Kingdom relations
Grade II listed buildings in the City of Westminster
Grade II listed houses
Houses in the Royal Borough of Kensington and Chelsea
South Kensington